Castelnuovo Parano is a comune (municipality) in the province of Frosinone in the Italian region Lazio, located about  southeast of Rome and about  southeast of Frosinone.

It originates from a castle built here in 1059 by abbot Desiderius of Montecassino to defend the area between Fratte and Traetto. The area was severely damaged during World War II due to its position across the Gustav Line. After the end of the conflict, much of the population emigrated.

References

Cities and towns in Lazio